Chimica Oggi – Chemistry Today is a bimonthly peer-reviewed scientific journal published by Tekno Scienze Publisher, covering chemistry. It was established in 1983 and the editor-in-chief is Silvana Maini.

Abstracting and indexing 
The journal is abstracted and indexed in Copyright Clearance Center, Chemical Abstracts, Science Citation Index Expanded, and Scopus. According to the Journal Citation Reports, the journal has a 2015 impact factor of 0.538.

References

External links 
 

Chemistry journals
Bimonthly journals
Publications established in 1983
English-language journals